Charles Frank Holmes (September 21, 1934 – March 13, 2019) was a Canadian professional ice hockey player who played 23 games in the National Hockey League with the Detroit Red Wings 1958 and 1962. The rest of his career, which lasted from 1955 to 1971, was mainly spent in the minor Western Hockey League. He is the son of the former NHL hockey player, Louis Holmes.

Career statistics

Regular season and playoffs

References

External links
 

1934 births
2019 deaths
Canadian ice hockey right wingers
Detroit Red Wings players
Edmonton Flyers (WHL) players
Edmonton Oil Kings (WCHL) players
Memphis Wings players
Pittsburgh Hornets players
Portland Buckaroos players
Seattle Totems (WHL) players
Ice hockey people from Edmonton